Jo Burt (born 1956) is an English rock musician. He is possibly best known for being the bassist for Black Sabbath during their 1987 tour in support of the album The Eternal Idol. He left the band once the tour ended.

Jo Burt was also a founding member of Sector 27 with Tom Robinson - and a member of Virginia Wolf with Jason Bonham. Burt also appears on Freddie Mercury's solo album, Mr. Bad Guy playing fretless bass.

He has written, toured, and performed with many other artists, including The Troggs, Brian Setzer, Bob Geldof, Roger Taylor, James Reyne, Sweet and many more.

Burt continues to write music and now lives in Dorset with his wife, Antonia (a soprano). Burt still performs regularly in the UK, Europe and North America with his band, The Jo Burt Experience. He calls his southern-style rock with a trippy Beatles-esque English twist sound "Anglicana" - a term he coined himself - and describes it as "Nashville Rock with an English Accent".

Burt has independently released three albums: Seven Seeds (2012), Indestructible (2015) and Spontaneous (2017). A fourth album is expected in 2022.

External links 
 

1956 births
Living people
Black Sabbath members
English heavy metal bass guitarists
English rock bass guitarists
Male bass guitarists
People from Sherborne